Teodoro "Theo" Rafael Arguelles Yangco (November 9, 1861 – April 20, 1939) was a Filipino businessman who served in a variety of public and civic offices, and was considered to be the foremost Filipino philanthropist of his time. He served as the Resident Commissioner of the Philippines (1917–1920). He was the longest serving president of the YMCA in the Philippines (1911–1925) and was called the "Father of the YMCA of the Philippines".

Biography
Yangco was born on November 9, 1861 in San Antonio, Zambales. He was the only child of shipping magnate Luis R. Yangco and Ramona Arguelles Corpus, widow of Tomas Corpus and is of Chinese descent through his father. He graduated with a Bachelor of Arts degree at the Ateneo Municipal de Manila in 1880 and graduated from the University of Santo Tomas in 1881. He pursued a commercial course at Ealing Commercial College in London from 1882 to 1886.

Yangco established a shipping company, organized a bus company called TRY TRAN, set up a shipyard, a big department store named Bazar Siglo XX and a huge dry goods market in Divisoria called Yangco Market. He also became president of Insular Life. He followed his father's practice of investing his surplus earnings in properties suitable for commercial purposes.

A member of the Nacionalista Party, Yangco succeeded Manuel L. Quezon, who later became President of the Philippines, as Resident Commissioner of the Philippines to the U.S. Congress and served from March 4, 1917 to March 3, 1920. He was not a candidate for renomination in 1920, and resumed his business activities in Manila.

Yangco was one of the founders of the Chamber of Commerce of the Philippines and was its president for several years. In 1923, he represented it in the first Pan Pacific Commercial Conference in Honolulu, Hawaii where he eloquently defended the cause for Philippine independence.

He died on April 20, 1939. He is buried in the Manila North Cemetery.

Legacy
Yangco donated large sums of money to various charitable, religious and civic organizations. Aside from his cash donation, he also donated various parcels of land in Metro Manila and Zambales. One of the biggest properties he donated was the 31,031 square meter lot in a commercial area in Manila that became the site of YMCA of the Philippines.

References

External links

1861 births
1939 deaths
Ateneo de Manila University alumni
Burials at the Manila North Cemetery
Members of the United States Congress of Filipino descent
People from Zambales
Resident Commissioners of the Philippines
Nacionalista Party politicians
University of Santo Tomas alumni
YMCA leaders
Members of the United States Congress of Chinese descent